Cafe Noir is a 2009 South Korean romance melodrama film starring Shin Ha-kyun, Moon Jeong-hee, Kim Hye-na and Jung Yu-mi. Written and directed by first-time director Jung Sung-il, a well regarded film critic-turned-director, it is a contemplation on love and heartbreak largely based on two works of literature - Johann Wolfgang von Goethe's The Sorrows of Young Werther and Fyodor Dostoyevsky's White Nights. The critically acclaimed work debuted at the 66th Venice Film Festival in 2009, and Jung was nominated for New Talent Grand Pix at the 2010 Copenhagen International Film Festival.

Synopsis
Young-soo (Shin Ha-kyun), a music teacher, has an affair with his student's mother, Mi-yeon (Moon Jeong-hee). He becomes desperate when Mi-yeon decides to end their relationship following the return of her husband (Lee Sung-min). He tries to kill the husband and when it fails, he realizes that for the happiness of the woman he loves, he must leave her.

Later, Young-soo meets a young woman Sun-hwa (Jung Yu-mi) by chance, who is waiting for her lover (Kim Sang-kyung) on the bridge for a year. He begins to see her every day and falls for her. Just when she decides to give up thinking that her lover does not love her anymore, he suddenly appears on the bridge. They leave together happily, leaving Young-soo behind.

Cast
 Shin Ha-kyun as Young-soo 
 Moon Jeong-hee as Mi-yeon 1
 Kim Hye-na as Mi-yeon 2
 Jung Yu-mi as Sun-hwa
 Lee Sung-min as Mi-yeon 1's husband
 Kim Sang-kyung as Sun-hwa's lover
 Yozoh as Shim Eun-ha
 Lee Yong-nyeo as Young-soo's mother / Fortuneteller auntie 
 Yoon Hee-seok as Man smoking at Seoul Land

Festivals
Cafe Noir was screened for a full year at various events of the festival circuit before it was given a domestic release in late December 2010. The DVD was finally released in June 2012.

Venice International Film Festival (2009) - International Critic's Week 
Venice International Film Critics' Week (2009) 
Busan International Film Festival (2009) - Korean Cinema Today - Panorama 
Copenhagen International Film Festival (2010) - New Talent Grand Pix 
LA Film Fest (2010) - International Showcase 
T-Mobile New Horizons International Film Festival (2010) - Panorama 
Munich International Film Festival (2010) - Focus on the Far East 
Hong Kong International Film Festival (2010) - Indie Power 
International Film Festival Rotterdam (2010) - Bright Future

Reception
Cafe Noir received positive reviews.

References

External links 
 
 
 

2009 films
2000s Korean-language films
South Korean romantic drama films
Films directed by Jung Sung-il
2000s South Korean films